The Sheep Look Up is a science fiction novel by British author John Brunner, first published in 1972. The novel is decidedly dystopian; the book deals with the deterioration of the environment in the United States. It was nominated for the Nebula Award for Best Novel in 1972.

The novel is the third in Brunner's "Club of Rome Quartet" , each novel dealing with a separate social issue. The Sheep Look Up explores a future dystopia occurring as a result of rampant consumerism and pollution. It follows 1968's Stand on Zanzibar (overpopulation) and 1969's The Jagged Orbit (racial tension and violence), and precedes 1975's The Shockwave Rider (technology and future shock).

Background 

The novel takes place in an unspecified year in the near future (at one point said to be in the 1980s, roughly a decade after the novel's publication). Human activities have resulted in wholesale destruction of the environment.

Water pollution is so severe that "don't drink" notices are frequently issued. Household water filters are popular items. Air pollution has reached the point that people in urban areas cannot go outside without wearing air masks. Such fumes left behind by aircraft that they cause air sickness in planes trailing behind. California is blanketed by a thick layer of smog that prevents the sun from shining through. Acid rain forces people to cover themselves in plastic so that their clothes do not get ruined. The sea has become so polluted and the beaches so strewn with garbage that people now vacation in the mountains.

Coastal waters are mostly covered by a stinky, oily film made up of sewage, detergents, industrial effluent, and cellulose microfibers. The Mediterranean Sea is poisoned beyond recovery, which leads to war, famine, and civil unrest in the surrounding countries. The Baltic, Great Lakes, and Caspian are also described as being poisoned. The use of defoliants and herbicides leads to the Mekong Delta becoming a desert. The heavy use of chemicals has made large swathes of farmland unsuitable for growing anything, resulting in higher food prices.

Many animal species and surface sea fish are on the brink of extinction, and birds are not as common as before, the bald eagle having gone extinct. Overuse of antibiotics has made a host of bacteria resistant and infectious disease is rampant. Household pests have also grown resistant to pesticides, and a new type of agricultural pest, known as Jigras, causes food shortages.

The right-wing government is indifferent to those problems. The President, known as Prexy, can only offer snappy quotes in response to various disasters. When poisonings and famine become rampant, the government scapegoats Honduran communist rebels and puts the country under martial law. It resorts to violence and oppression to silence its critics.

References are made to attempts to rein in the environmental destruction, but they are depicted as having made no difference to the state of the environment. Even so, one Republican Senator claims that the regulations are destroying American business.

Crime, racial, and civil unrest is growing. Travel abroad is discouraged because of terrorist attacks on planes, and fewer and fewer people graduate with science, engineering, or business management degrees, as agriculture and food-related degrees are most in demand and most likely to lead to emigration from the US. The number of poor people is growing while the decreasing number of wealthy people enclose themselves in walled communities guarded by armed mercenaries.

The US is said to be involved in various foreign wars, similar to the one in Vietnam, which was ongoing when the book was published. A conflict in Honduras is hampered first by American soldiers coming down with enteritis and then by the need to crack down on violence in the United States. Many young men flee the draft.

A growing group of environmentally-conscious activists calling themselves "Trainites" (from their hidden leader Austin Train) turn slowly to terrorist acts in an attempt to stop the corporations from spoiling the Earth. The character of Austin Train is an academic who despite predicting and interpreting social change, has become disillusioned by society's failure to listen. The character is used to drive the plot and to explain the background story to the reader.

Plot 
"The Sheep Look Up" takes place over the course of a single year, with each chapter depicting one month. The story is a multi-strand one, involving a variety of characters whose paths only cross as the world's ecological disaster brings them together.

December
The novel starts with a man running across the Santa Monica Freeway in a bizarre incident before getting killed when he is hit by a car. The accident and the ensuing traffic jam results in Philip Mason, a Denver-based executive at the Angel City insurance company, being late for a meeting. The head of the insurance company says that it has to increase life insurance premiums because of the declining life expectancy in the United States. Peg Mankiewicz, a journalist, identifies the body of the man in the freeway accident as her friend Decimus Jones. Later, Peg meets with her friend and influential ecologist, Austin Train, from whom the Trainites take their name. He has gone underground and is working as a mall Santa. Peg is one of the few people able to contact him. In Honduras, a group of UN investigators is looking into a famine nation ridden by civil war. They examine a ruined coffee farm and discover mysterious wormlike insects filling the roots of the plants with holes. They are known as Jigras and are immune to every known insecticide. Jacob Bamberley, heir to an oil fortune and head of Bamberley Trust, a charitable institution that manufactures Nutripon, a hydroponically-grown food product that is meant to provide relief in places afflicted by famine, gives his adopted son Hugh Pettingill a tour of the factory in Denver. Hugh is not impressed by his adoptive father's work. In Africa, in a village called Noshri, a nurse named Lucy Ramage is on hand to receive shipment of Nutripon when suddenly, the villagers seem to go insane and start murdering each other. She is saved by UN soldiers, who put down the riots.

January
A supersonic airliner flying over the Rockies causes an avalanche with its sonic boom that destroys a brand new ski resort in Towerhill, Colorado. A police officer, named Pete Goddard, becomes a hero after he saves a group of children trapped in the snow from being crushed by a steel beam. Peg learns from an autopsy that Decimus had a psychedelic drug in his system. Knowing that he was not a drug user, she decides to get to the bottom of it. Jacob, trying to debunk allegations that Nutripon was responsible for the violence at Noshri, is a guest on the Petronella Page show, a popular news show. The host forces him to eat a bowlful of it. Suddenly, a bomb threat forces the studio to be evacuated.

February
In Ireland, Doctor Michael Advowson is treating a young girl, who injured her toe after she played on a farm that was being used as a garbage dump. A visitor informs him to report to the United Nations to help investigate the Noshri riots. Philip is diagnosed with gonorrhea from a one-night stand in Las Vegas and has exposed his wife. Lucy finds herself in a mental hospital in England after she had been afflicted with the same insanity as the people of Noshri. She describes the horrors of the riots. A similar occurrence happens in Honduras. Hugh runs away from home after he confronts Jacob about his role in the Noshri disaster.

March
Peg and Decimus's sister Felice are driving to the Colorado commune that Decimus was a part of, known as the "wat", and pick up Hugh, whose car had broken down. At the wat, they meet Zena, Decimus's widow. They present the wat with a canister of imported earthworms. A Honduran man from a boat on the heavily-polluted Pacific, sets off balloons carrying napalm that cause death and destruction all over San Diego. Philip loses his job, the result of Angel City's woes from the Towerhill disaster. He is then drawn into a business scheme by his friend Alan Prosser, who runs a plumbing firm, to sell household water filters manufactured by the Mitsuyama Corporation of Japan. Alan wants to use Pete Goddard as their spokesman to take advantage of his hero status. Michael conducts an analysis of the Nutripon at Noshri and discovers that it contained Ergot, a substance known to cause hallucinations and dementia. As he is flying to New York, Lucy happens to be on the same plane and tells him her theory that the food was intentionally poisoned in an attempt to weaken the governments of third world countries to allow the exploitation of their resources.

April
Gerry Thorne, an executive at Bamberley Trust, is at his home in the Caribbean to talk to fellow executive Moses Greenbriar when he hears Moses's wife screaming. Gerry's wife, Nancy, who was out swimming, has been exposed to a nerve agent that was dumped into sea by the military at the end of World War I and is contained in barrels that periodically surface. She dies from the exposure, and Gerry vows to get justice. Hugh is becoming accustomed to life at the wat. He starts smoking marijuana with another member of the Wat, Carl Travers, who is also Pete's brother. They wind up making love. In New York, Michael meets with Jacob to discuss potential poisoning of Nutripon. Jacob wants Michael to certify the plant's new safety equipment. During the meeting, a Trainite car bomb goes off and destroys the office. Mitsuyama sends Hideki Katsamura on a tour of the United States as the company launches its water filters. Throughout the journey, Katsamura is afflicted with diarrhea. He winds up being patient zero for an outbreak of acute enteritis that ravages the country. It is left unstated whether it was an intentional poisoning to increase water filter sales.

May
The enteritis epidemic hits America hard, and 35 million people become infected. Many are unable to work; businesses are forced to run on skeleton crews; and public services such as police, mass transit, and garbage collection are severely disrupted. At the wat, it is discovered that Felice's worms included Jigras, which ruin the vegetable crop. The Jigras begin spreading across the nation, which results in a dire food shortage. Jacob publicly swears to destroy his Nutripon inventory in a public relations exercise. Hugh and Carl, having left the wat and wanting to take more serious action for the environment, meet a man calling himself Austin Train, one of many imposters.

June
Michael arrives in Colorado to oversee the destruction of the Nutripon stocks. He meets some young people who want to eat what they think is poisoned food since they want to go insane. Michael tells them that the food is clean, and when he tries to give some to prove it, he is arrested, and a riot breaks out. The army uses laser cannons, and 63 people die in the fighting, Michael included. Peg meets with Lucy and a man named Fernando Arriegas to discuss the Noshri incident. At gunpoint, they force Peg to eat contaminated Nutripon. She winds up tripping out, and mysterious men enter the hotel room and kill Lucy and Fernando. Thorne meets Professor Quarrey and his wife to discuss whether he has a case against the state department for his wife's death. The conversation goes into Puritan Foods, a company claiming to sell uncontaminated food and is tied to an organized crime group called The Syndicate, but after careful analysis, Quarrey has found that Puritan is no better than regular food and that some of it must come from outside of North America, as the continent has too little uncontaminated farmland to grow all the food that it sells. They also discuss how the Jigras entered the United States. A worm importer in Texas passed them off as regular worms, which allowed them to get past inspection. As Thorne leaves, men show up at the apartment and kill him, Quarrey, and his wife.

July
Jacob is confronted by his wife, Maud, who calls him a murderer for the poisonings of Noshri and Honduras. He angrily retreats to his study, where he eats a candy bar confiscated from one of his chronically-ill children. He has an allergic reaction, falls out the window, and dies. Trainites begin to resort to terrorism. They bomb gas stations, blow up a new highway interchange in Alabama, sabotage a lumber mill in Georgia, and murder loggers who are trying to cut down California's remaining redwood trees. Hugh, Carl, and the Austin Train impersonator they call Ossie plot to kidnap Hector Bamberley, who is the son of Roland Bamberley and the nephew of Jacob. Roland has become the West Coast distributor for Mitsuyama water filters, and the company wants to extort him into giving them away for free. Peg wakes up in a hospital and is questioned by a doctor, who is coerced by a federal agent, about her ties to Austin Train.

August
The Mitsuyama water filters are discovered to be faulty and to clog up constantly with bacteria. Alan Prosser faces ruin with having to replace them. In Colorado, there is a meeting of wat members from all over the country. They are discussing a report on Puritan Foods when suddenly, a low flying aircraft firebombs the compound and kills many. Hugh and Carl's friend Kitty, who owns the apartment in which they are living and keeping Hector, has sex with him. Peg convinces Austin, who is now working as a garbageman, to go public. He agrees after she says that she can get him on the Petronella Page show. Page wants to "crucify" him, but she is won over to his cause. After a major at a nuclear missile base in North Dakota suddenly goes crazy and almost murders his two kids, the government becomes convinced that the United States is under attack. Martial law begins to spread.

September
Hugh, Carl, and Ossie are worried about Hector's health and have given up hope that Roland will pay the ransom, let him go. Hector is ridden with all of the diseases that are now common in urban slums, much to the disbelief of his wealthy father. Hector claims that he was kidnapped by Austin Train, who is arrested on the Petronella Page show. At Prosser's offices, an employee suddenly goes on a violent rampage and is subdued by Alan's gun. Hiwey, they can see that is not an isolated case since outside the office, Denver residents have gone insane, just like the villagers in Noshri. In the chaos, Philip drives Pete home, but once he gets to his apartment, his wife, Denise, reveals that their son Harold has viciously murdered his sister Jodie. Alan and his assistant Dorothy die after get trapped in the company's warehouse, which is set on fire.

October
The Masons are holed up in their apartment for days with the rotting corpse of their daughter. Eventually, some soldiers arrive and inform them that they are the first living people to be found in the building. Philip's friend and regular doctor, Doug McNeil, reveals that Denver's water supply has been contaminated with Ergot. Philip is told that he is being called to active duty as a soldier to supervise cleanup from the rioting. Hugh wanders back to his home and finds out that Maud has gone insane. After falsely claiming to be reporting for duty, he is exposed and put on a work gang with other suspected Trainites. Peg comes across him, and he reveals that Carl had given Decimus Jones a carton of Nutripon as a Christmas present, which explains why he suddenly ran across a freeway.

November
The United States is now on the brink of collapse. Ossie sets a bomb at a public building and then dies from fever and delirium. Philip is on patrol when another soldier accuses him of poisoning the water with his filters and kills him. Pete surprises his pregnant wife, Jeannie, with a microwave oven. She uses it to cook a chicken but suddenly collapses. At the hospital, it is revealed that the microwave was shoddily built, and radiation leaked out and cooked Jeannie's unborn infant in the uterus. One morning, Pete is discovered by Carl in the living room scribbling notes from a book and says that he is learning how to make a bomb. Peg is covering Austin's trial. Hector quickly realizes that he was not kidnapped by the real Austin Train and reveals he had been coerced into saying that he was. Austin takes the opportunity to make a speech at his heavily-televised trial. He pleads for humanity to stop destroying its environment. He also reveals the source of the Ergot poisonings. In 1963, the government stored drums of Ergot-based nerve gas in the mountains surrounding Denver. One day, just before Christmas, an injection induced earthquake caused the drum to rupture and to leak its contents into the water table supplying the Nutripon factory, which contaminated the food it produced. Another one caused a much larger leak, which poisoned all of Denver. As he finishes his speech, a cameraman informs him that the President has ordered the broadcast to cease. Ossie's bomb then detonates and presumably kills everyone in the courtroom. Tom Grey, an actuary at Angel City, had been throughout the novel, devising a computer simulation of earth to figure out a solution to earth's ecological problems. The ironic and morbidly-humorous results are reported on the Petronella Page show. The final scene takes place in Ireland, where a woman is letting a doctor into her home. She sees billowing plumes of smoke and suggests them to call the fire department. The doctor responds, “The brigade would have a long way to go, it’s from America. The wind’s blowing that way.”

Next Year
The final chapter of the book is simply a few lines from John Milton's poem Lycidas from which the novel derives its title: 
 The hungry sheep look up, and are not fed,
 But swollen with wind and the rank mist they draw,
 Rot inwardly, and foul contagion spread....

Publication notes 
Despite being nominated for a Nebula Award, the book fell out of print, only later being republished in 2003. The new edition contains a foreword by David Brin and an afterword by environmentalist and social change theorist James John Bell. Brin's foreword attempts to ground the book in Brunner's time, and in the context of his other writings.

In the afterword, Bell treats the book almost as prophecy, drawing parallels between events in the book and subsequent real-world developments: "His words have a kind of Gnostic power embedded in them that gives his characters passage into our world," and notes that "Brunner's puppet of a president, affectionately called Prexy, is a dead ringer for our Dubya".

Writer William Gibson made a similar remark in a 2007 interview:

See also 
 Quotes from The Sheep Look Up on Wikiquote

References

External links 
 Review by Science Fiction Weekly
 Stephen H. Goldman, "John Brunner's Dystopias: Heroic Man in Unheroic Society", Science Fiction Studies 16, 1978

1972 British novels
1972 science fiction novels
British science fiction novels
Dystopian novels
Eco-terrorism in fiction
Environmental fiction books
Harper & Row books
Novels by John Brunner